The British Muslim Forum is an organization of Sunni Muslims which represents 500 Mosques across the UK. Muhammad Imdad Hussain Pirzada is the current President of the organization.

Leaders
Following are the founding members and main leaders of BMF.
Shaykh Muhammad Imdad Hussain Pirzada (Retford, UK)
Shaykh Syed Maroof Hussain Shah (Bradford, UK)
Shaykh Mohammad Habib-ur-Rehman Mahboobi (Bradford, UK)
Allama Shahid Raza Na’eemi OBE (London, UK)
Allama Ahmad Nisar Beg Qadri (Manchester, UK)
Allama Muhammad Bostan Qadri Birmingham, UK)
Allama Riaz Ahmad Samdani (London, UK)
Allama Khalil Ahmed Haqani (London, UK)
Allama Masood Alam Khan Al-Azhari (Nottingham, UK)

Fatwa (Islamic verdict) issued 2005 in response to the London bombings

On behalf of over 500 clerics, scholars and Imams the British Muslim Forum issues the following religious decree:

Gul Mohammad, the then, secretary-general of the BMF, quoted the Koran saying: "Whoever kills a human being ... then it is as though he has killed all mankind, and whoever saves a human life it is as though he had saved all mankind.

References

External links

British Muslim Forum

Islamic organisations based in the United Kingdom